Sandzėnai (formerly ) is a village in Kėdainiai district municipality, in Kaunas County, in central Lithuania. According to the 2011 census, the village has a population of 0 people. It is located 2 km from Dotnuva. The village was depopulated during Soviet era land improvement program (1979 census was the last with a population detected).

Demography

References

Villages in Kaunas County
Kėdainiai District Municipality